Excelsa  may refer to:
 Excelsa coffee, a crop plant

Fictional characters
Exelsa, the Argentine housemaid in the Mexican sitcom, La familia P. Luche